Tris(dimethylamino)phosphine is an organophosphorus compound with the formula P(NMe2)3  (Me = methyl).  It is a colorless oil at room temperature, and is one of the most common aminophosphines.  Its structure has been determined by X-ray crystallography.

Tris(dimethylamino)phosphine acts as a base.  It reacts with oxygen to give hexamethylphosphoramide, O=P(NMe2)3, and with sulfur to give the corresponding compound hexamethylthiophosphoramide, S=P(NMe2)3.  It can also act as a ligand, forming complexes with a variety of metal centers.  Its steric and electronic properties are similar to those of triisopropylphosphine.

Because of its affinity for sulfur, tris(dimethylamino)phosphine is also effective as a desulfurization agent, e.g., in the conversion of dibenzyl disulfide into dibenzyl sulfide:
PhCH2SSCH2Ph  +  P(NMe2)3  →   S=P(NMe2)3  +  PhCH2SCH2Ph   (Ph = phenyl)

References

Phosphines